Esmerelda "Esme" Weatherwax (also Granny Weatherwax or Mistress Weatherwax) is a fictional character  from Terry Pratchett's Discworld series. She is a witch and member of the Lancre coven. She is the self-appointed guardian of her small country, and frequently defends it against supernatural powers. She is one of the Discworld series's main protagonists, having major roles in seven novels.

She is a very powerful witch, and is reckoned to be more powerful than the most well-known witch on the Discworld, Black Aliss (real name: Aliss Demurrage), who is responsible for any number of witcheries in fairy tales, such as putting a castle to sleep and getting pushed into her own oven by naughty children. It does seem that her teacher's teacher's teacher's teacher was Black Aliss. ("I learned my craft from Nanny Gripes, who learned it from Goody Heggety, who got it from Nanna Plumb, who was taught it by Black Aliss..." – Granny, in Lords and Ladies). From the triple nature of a coven (maiden, mother, and crone), it has been suggested that she embodies all three, although the crone is the most obvious. In any case, this appellation is tactfully avoided in her presence, with those commenting on the coven's structure calling her "the other one".

Granny Weatherwax's prowess and reputation has led to her being recognized as the leader (or prima inter pares) of the community of Witches in the Ramtops: "Witches are not by nature gregarious, at least with other witches, and they certainly don't have leaders.  Granny Weatherwax was the most highly-regarded of the leaders they didn't have." In Wyrd Sisters, the ghost of the late Lancre King, Verence I, addressed Granny Weatherwax as "Doyenne of Witches" ("Senior Witch of Witches"). Granny Weatherwax's reputation even extends beyond species barriers – the Trolls of the Ramtops call her "Aaoograha hoa" ("She Who Must Be Avoided"; mentioned in Maskerade), the Dwarf call her "K'ez'rek d'b'duz" ("Go Around the Other Side of the Mountain"; also mentioned in Maskerade), and the Nac Mac Feegle call her "The Hag O' Hags" ("The High Witch"). Granny also has a reputation for trickery and pushiness among younger witches, although this is either short-lived or unmentioned for obvious reasons.

Background
According to Witches Abroad, Esmerelda "Esme" (later "Granny") Weatherwax was born the younger of two daughters.  The books do not indicate whether her mother was a witch or not, but Granny mentions that her father was a hunter, who taught her that "a bad hunter chases, a good hunter waits" (Lords and Ladies). While Granny was practically still just a bairn, her teenaged, older sister, Lily, was getting into increasingly frequent rows with her parents over her behavior. As Granny reveals to Nanny Ogg in Witches Abroad, Lily was wanton, using magic for it and not just ordinary magic; "she was wilful", as Granny describes it, able to remember her sister's and mother's rows even at that young age; Lily was vain and prideful ("always looking in mirrors... Prideful as a cat, she was. Prefer to look in a mirror than out of a window, she would"); and "young men's fathers used to come round to complain", culminating in Lily being kicked out of the household at the age of thirteen.

After Granny grew up, she was adamant about becoming a witch; as she reveals in Lords and Ladies, magic did not choose her, she chose it ("I never stood in front of no-one... I camped on old Nanny Gripes' garden until she promised to tell me everything she knew. Hah. That took her a week  I had the afternoons free... No  chose..."). Granny would go on to become a fully-fledged witch, and at some point took responsibility for her own steading, the village of Bad Ass and the Kingdom of Lancre as a whole. Granny Weatherwax, as she would later come to be known, also nursed her ailing mother until the time of her death (what became of her father has never been mentioned). While still a young woman, Granny was involved in a summer-long romance with then-aspiring wizard Mustrum Ridcully, but ultimately they were both committed to their respective paths of witchcraft and wizardry.

Granny is estimated to be in her seventies during the events of Wyrd Sisters, Witches Abroad, Lords and Ladies, Maskerade and Carpe Jugulum, the same age as Nanny Ogg (having grown up with her). Yet, by the standards of Mistress Treason, she is still considered a girl (Wintersmith).

Granny Weatherwax passes away early in the events of The Shepherd's Crown, now in her 80s; where, after experiencing The Call, she tidies-up her cottage, prepares her own wicker casket, and sets her last will and testament down in writing (confirming instructions she had already confided to Nanny Ogg), before laying herself to rest in her own bed one last time. When Death comes for her, he asks her if she was content with her life, with Granny confirming that she was satisfied to have lived the way she did and kept her part of the world safe, Death in turn assuring her that her candle will continue to flicker long after her passing and that she has left the world in a better condition than it was when she entered it. Her death is felt across the Disc; Nanny Ogg and Tiffany Aching arrive first to lay her to rest in the forest at a site pre-chosen by Granny herself, and Archchancellor Mustrum Ridcully visits briefly to pay his last respects. Over the course of the events of The Shepherd's Crown, Tiffany Aching, who Granny has named her beneficiary, overstretches herself trying to witch two steadings and live up to Granny's reputation as the new 'Witch of Witches', but eventually comes to accept the need to do things her way rather than simply make herself do everything Granny did.

Appearance
Granny Weatherwax, if she can help it, wears a plain black dress, a somewhat battered black cloak (occasionally lined with dark red) and a tall, pointed witch's hat, skewered to her "iron-hard grey bun" hairstyle with multiple hatpins. As described in Lords and Ladies, as a young woman her hair was long, blonde, and unkempt. She is thin, and, while not really that tall, has such a commanding presence that she seems tall. Many references are given to her striking blue eyes and penetrating gaze. In Equal Rites she is described as "handsome", having an excellent complexion, no warts, and all her teeth, although it is implied she finds this a bit inappropriate for a witch.

Personality
Granny Weatherwax has a near-unshakeable belief in her own abilities, which has proven near-accurate, and an extreme distrust of stories. She was intended by nature to be a "wicked witch" but, at an early age, realised she had to be "the good one" to balance her sister, Lily (Lilith). Ironically Lily, who became a fairy godmother, was convinced  was the good one, because she gave people what she thought they should want. Granny Weatherwax, however, gives people what they know they really need. Witches themselves seem hesitant to use "bad" or "good" as descriptors, especially when discussing very powerful witches; as Pratchett would put it: being Good (with a capital G) and Right (with a capital R) does not necessarily make one Nice (with a capital N), and Granny is not (Nice, that is). Granny prefers to be respected, and if that is tinged with an element of fear, so be it. And except for those who know her well, such as Nanny Ogg, Magrat Garlick, Agnes Nitt, and Tiffany Aching, people do respect and/or fear her rather than like her. However, very young children seem unintimidated by her because of a reputation that she will not intentionally harm them. People in Lancre know that she will always come when they need her and do her best for them, because that is Right (with a capital R).

Granny appreciates practicality and hard work over the bells and whistles of so-called "magick". She intensely dislikes witches such as Letice Earwig, who dabble in chants, pendants, and crystals. She claimed she would have liked to have met Tiffany's grandmother, Granny Aching, likely because she never claimed to be anything more than a shepherd despite commanding all the respect and power of a witch.

Granny Weatherwax feels little need for personal possessions and keeps most of them in a single wooden box. This box is known to contain a few keepsakes, including a bundle of letters (some, or all, of which are believed to be from a young Mustrum Ridcully) a chunk of lodestone from "the dancers" stone circle, a fossil ammonite and a phoenix feather in a glass bottle. However, the citizens of Lancre also believe it contains the secrets of the universe, a neverending fortune in gold, or a small universe. Granny has done little to discourage these rumours. Aside from those in the box, her only other notable possessions are a clock that she inherited from her mother and a silver tea service (which was later melted down to make horseshoes for a Unicorn during the events of Lords and Ladies), complete with a cream jug in the shape of a humorous cow (which she had planned to leave to Magrat Garlick, per her Will, in the event of her death).

The journal Gender Forum has posited that Granny Weatherwax bears some similarity to Sam Vimes and Death. All three are effectively 'good' characters, who exert a rigid control over the darkness inside themselves, which they secretly fear but (crucially to their characters) are able to conquer.

According to The Pratchett Portfolio her typical saying is: "I can't be having with that kind of thing". Unlike most 'typical sayings' in the Folio, it is actually recorded that Granny says this, or at least Nanny Ogg says something very similar when she pretends to be Granny while briefly taking over the role of the other one (i.e. the Crone) due to Granny's temporary retirement, and Agnes and Count de Magpyr saying or hearing it in their heads while under the influence of fragments of her mind, as well as Granny saying it while unconscious at exactly the same moment as the count doing so, in Carpe Jugulum.

Family and relationships
She has not known physical love as demonstrated by her ability to capture unicorns, traditionally only possible to virgins, and as she explicitly tells Nanny Ogg in Lords and Ladies. There have, however, been romances in her life.

Granny Weatherwax nursed her mother until the time of her death, and is a distant cousin to Galder Weatherwax, a former Archchancellor of the Unseen University. She has an elder sister, Lily Weatherwax, who appears in Witches Abroad. As a young woman, she was briefly romantically involved with Mustrum Ridcully. It has been hinted that she married him in an alternative reality and had several children. As a youth, she briefly called herself "Endemonidia" but only for a few hours (in the Discworld, not all names have staying power like Perdita's), showing that even the wisest witches started off slightly small and petty.

She has recruited at least one apprentice in her time, Eskarina Smith, who became the Discworld's first female wizard (Equal Rites) and was subsequently not mentioned in canon again until the events of I Shall Wear Midnight. Magrat Garlick, Agnes Nitt and Tiffany Aching were officially taught by other Witches, but also learned from Granny Weatherwax from time to time.

Granny's broom is famous for being old and temperamental. It is a hand-me-down "borrowed" from her colleague Hilta (Equal Rites). It has been repaired so often that none of the original broom remains, having had both the shaft and bristles repeatedly replaced and it often requires the user to pick up speed by running along the ground, making it the only broom on the Disc that requires bump starting. It is, however, considerably faster than most brooms once it gets going.

In an apparent test to unearth her softer side, Tiffany Aching made her the reluctant custodian of a small white kitten, for which Granny has so far managed to show affection in a completely unaffectionate manner. In keeping with her personality, she christened it "You", as in "Hey You, get off the shelves!" or "Come inside, You!" As a kitten, You was once discovered sleeping on Granny's head, underneath her hat; Granny claimed it kept her head warm. Upon reaching adulthood, You relinquished Granny's hat and was commonly found draped over Granny's shoulders like a recumbent queen, adding an extra bit of power to Granny's already-formidable presence. You is the only known cat (though not the only animal) on the Discworld to have intimidated Nanny Ogg's battle-scarred tom Greebo, who hides in fear whenever You is in the same room; this suggests she may be compatible with Granny Weatherwax in temperament after all.

Upon Granny Weatherwax's death, You finds Tiffany Aching, as a way of either telling Tiffany that Granny was dead, or passing herself on to Tiffany. Either way, this was considered to be extra proof that Tiffany was to take over Granny's role as "head witch".

Headology
Despite her power, Granny Weatherwax rarely uses magic in any immediately recognizable form. Instead, she prefers to use headology, a sort of folk-psychology which can be summed up as "if people  you're a witch, you might as well  one". For instance, Granny could, if she wished, curse people. However it is simpler for her to trick people into believing she has cursed them, then letting them assume her responsible for the next bit of bad luck that happens to befall them; given her reputation this tends to cause such people to flee the country entirely. Nanny Ogg has obliquely implied this avoidance of magic prevents Granny from being tempted into becoming a very successful "bad" witch.

Headology bears some similarities to psychology in that it requires the user to hold a deep-seated understanding of the workings of the human mind in order to be used successfully. However, headology tends to differ from psychology in that it usually involves approaching a problem from an entirely different angle.

It has been said that the difference between headology and psychiatry is that, were one to approach either with a belief that one was being chased by a monster, a psychiatrist will convince one that there are no monsters coming after one, whereas a headologist will hand you a large stick and a chair to stand on. The headology approach is also very similar to Susan Sto Helit's practical approach to children's problems; since the child already believes in Bogeymen, one may as well go along with it and teach them that they can also very firmly believe in the fireplace poker, too.

Powers
Because of her reluctance to openly use magic, other Discworld characters have, at various times, accused Granny Weatherwax of "working by trickery alone", and of "having little or no real power" (an accusation she shares with Lu-Tze). Both statements are wholly inaccurate. Though preferring not to use magic, Granny Weatherwax has, on several occasions, been seen to display several 'conventional' forms of power in abundance; including psychokinesis (Lords and Ladies) and pyrokinesis (The Sea and Little Fishes), as well as a number of 'less conventional' forms of power; including the ability to fade into the background of a room, to defer physical injury to a later point in time (Maskerade), and to make people believe they have been turned into animals such as frogs. (The ability to do it for real is also in her repertoire, but is also more tiring and less entertaining.) During a duel with the Archchancellor of Unseen University (Equal Rites), Granny was shown to turn into a great number of different creatures. GURPS Discworld suggests that the apparent transformations of both parties were only special effects, as Discworld spellcasters would not so carelessly tinker with their own morphic fields, while others simply attribute this to her first story appearance as a kind of prototype reworked in later stories (compare DEATH, originally a more malicious character). Regardless, Granny Weatherwax was shown to be a match for the Archchancellor. In Wyrd Sisters she unleashed considerably explosive magic on a cart after losing her temper for nearly being run over by it, and sent the entire nation of Lancre forward in time fifteen years so that the exiled heir to the throne would be of age to liberate the country from its henpecked usurper sooner rather than later, albeit with considerable effort and after much manipulation by Nanny Ogg. In The Sea and Little Fishes, Nanny Ogg claims that Esme has rather moderate talent, but is an extremely hard worker.

She is also highly adept at 'Borrowing' – the art of overlaying her mind on the mind of another creature so that she can see through its eyes and steer its actions without it being aware of her presence – and can tune her mind to the point that she can sense the underlying mood of her surroundings (including the mood of plants, animals and the earth) and the presence of 'stories' that are trying to play themselves out. She has even borrowed a beehive, considered the most difficult mind to borrow due to it being spread over many bodies, being the only witch ever to do so, and the mind of the Unseen University itself (in Lords And Ladies and Equal Rites, respectively). In Wyrd Sisters, her second appearance, she makes contact with the very mind of Lancre itself. However, while her mind is out Borrowing, her body falls into a catatonic, almost deathlike trance; it is revealed in Lords And Ladies that in order to prevent embarrassing accidents, she has taken to wearing a placard reading "I ATE'NT DEAD"  when she does so. (After her actual death, she was found lying in bed with this placard on her chest, "ATE'NT" crossed out and the card now reading "I IS PROBLY DEAD").

She has even been known to be able to detect the memories of Granny Weatherwaxes living in alternative realities, but only at points in time when the walls between her world and other worlds are particularly thin.

Limitations
Knowing what is Right (with a capital R) is the bedrock of Granny Weatherwax's beliefs, and it is this that prevents her from using her considerable psychic and occult abilities for her own gain. It has also, thus far, been the primary limiting factor on her power; as she explains in Maskerade, if she was a bad witch she could break people's bones where they stood and manipulate their minds at will, but she cannot be that bad witch, as she knows what is Right. This, of course, has not stopped her from becoming increasingly powerful, to the point where she even managed to not only resist the fatal embrace of a vampire's bite, but also reverse the curse, causing her assailant to become weaker from within while craving tea and biscuits.

Granny has been described as incapable of harming a child.  Children, up to a certain age, seem to realize this: on one occasion she threatened to rip Pewsey Ogg's head off and fill it with snakes; his response was, "Funny lady!". Children past toddlerhood generally find her intimidating, as do most adults.

In addition to the limitations imposed by her morality, it has been previously stated that there are some forms of magic that Granny Weatherwax cannot do, either through inability or aversion. These forms include some of those most commonly associated with Wizardry, including pyrokinesis (Equal Rites).  She has, however, ignited a log by glaring at it until it combusted out of pure embarrassment. She also claimed it was impossible to catch a sword in one's hand without being hurt but appeared to do just that shortly afterward (at the end of the book it was revealed that she had merely deferred experiencing the cut). It has been said that when Granny says a task is impossible, she means it is impossible for anyone but herself.

The only thing which repeatedly defeats Granny is her flying broomstick. It refuses to start smoothly, despite dwarfs replacing both handle and sticks. She maintains, however, that it "will be Right as Rain with a bit of work" .

Granny's relationship with the written word is strained, bordering on combative. Equal Rites mentions that she views reading as similar to and as bad as necromancy: as most authors are dead, the point of both studies is to find the opinions of the dead, and "they have enough to worry about without that." That opinion is not entirely unlike the views of the Chalk's Nac Mac Feegles.

Bibliography
Granny Weatherwax is one of Terry Pratchett's most prolific recurring characters. She has starred in six Discworld novels (Equal Rites, Wyrd Sisters, Witches Abroad, Lords and Ladies, Maskerade and Carpe Jugulum), has appeared briefly in Wee Free Men, acted as a significant supporting character in A Hat Full of Sky, Wintersmith, and I Shall Wear Midnight, and was referenced in three other Discworld books (by name in Mort, and anonymously in Thief of Time as well as Going Postal). She also appeared in the short story The Sea and Little Fishes and in The Science of Discworld II: The Globe. She dies of old age at the beginning of The Shepherd's Crown, although Neil Gaiman, a friend of Pratchett's, has stated that Pratchett intended to imply that Granny had temporarily put her consciousness into You the cat, to delay her death and later go with Death on her own volition instead of being taken.

A. S. Byatt considered that Granny "became more and more complex" as she appeared in more novels, while National Public Radio considered her an "iconic" character and "one of [Pratchett]'s clear favorites".

In the Wyrd Sisters animated adaptation, Granny Weatherwax was voiced by Annette Crosbie and in the BBC Radio 4 dramatisation she was played by Sheila Hancock.

Reception and legacy
A fossil species of Mesozoic ginkgo has been named Ginkgoites weatherwaxiae in Granny Weatherwax's honour.

References

External links

 Granny Weatherwax , In Discworld Wiki
 The Witches reading order - A guide to the story arc introducing and featuring Granny Weatherwax.

Discworld witches
Literary characters introduced in 1987